The Nalumasortoq or Naluumasortoq is a 2,045 meter high mountain in southern Greenland, in the Kujalleq municipality.

Geography
The mountain rises not far from Nanortalik, in the mountainous peninsula of the mainland which forms the eastern side of the Tasermiut Fjord. 

The Nalumasortoq closes an east-facing valley that lies between the Ulamertorsuaq and Ketil  mountain peaks and with its 2,045 m it is the tallest peak of the group. Glaciers only appear below 1,600 meters in the east, NW and SW. Its massive western wall is especially popular among mountain climbers.

See also
Big wall climbing
List of mountains in Greenland

Bibliography
Greenland Tourism: Hiking Map South Greenland/Tasermiut fjorden – Nanortalik. 1996

References

External links
Climbing routes - Nalumasortoq
Greenland Chapter 2: Getting into it… Big Walls!
Mountains of Greenland